Vadapalle is a village  in Konaseema district of the Indian state of Andhra Pradesh. It is located in Atreyapuram Mandal of Ravulapalem revenue division. This village is famous for its temple with presiding deity Sri Venkateswara Swamy (also known as Yedu Sanivaramulu Venkanna).

Civil Disobedience Movement (1930) - Unsung Flag Martyrs 
The following residents of East Godavari district, Andhra Pradesh took part in the Civil Disobedience Movement (1930). On the occasion of the Sri Venkateswara swami Chariot/Car Festival (Rathotsavam) in Vadapalli, on 30 March 1931, along with the deity, a Tricolour flag and photos of Mahatma Gandhi, and some other national leaders adorned the car. This was objected by the Government officials, and when the procession was about to start, the Sub-Inspector of Razolu removed the portraits of the national leaders. People resented the act and refused to draw the chariot (Ratham) without the portraits. Over this issue, a riot broke out at Chinnavadapalli. Police arrested some people and lathi-charged others and the crowd retaliated by throwing stones and mud on the police. Police retaliated by indiscriminately firing on the crowd. When the police opened fire to quell it, they died.

 Bandaru Narayanaswamy: Resident of v. Vadapalli, t. Razolu, distt. East Godavari, Andhra Pradesh; he lost his two legs in the police firing, and he breathed his last soon after he was taken home. [SMEAV, 2-10-1987, Vadapalli] (ICHR, Vol. 5, p. 22)
 Tatapati Venkataraju alias Venkatapatiraju: Resident of v. Alamur, t. Razolu, distt. East Godavari, Andhra Pradesh. Belonged to Kshatriya community; he was shot while proceeding to the river bund and died immediately. [The Hindu, 30April 1931; SMEAV, 2-10-1987, Tenali] (ICHR, Vol. 5, p. 229)
 Vadapalli Gangachalam: Resident of v. Vadapalli, t. Razolu, distt. East Godavari, Andhra Pradesh. Belonged to Rajaka community; received a bullet shot in the police firing and died at the time of a being taken to his house. [SMEAV, 2-10-1987, Vadapalli; WWIM, I, p. 106]. (ICHR, Vol. 5, p. 245).(4)

References 

https://www.indiaculture.nic.in/sites/default/files/pdf/Martyrs_Vol_5_06_03_2019.pdf

Villages in Atreyapuram mandal